Sarah Marshall may refer to:

 Sarah Marshall (British actress) (1933-2014), British stage, TV and film actress
 Sarah Marshall (American stage actress) (born 1955)
 Sarah Marshall (French model) (born 1981), French model and actress

See also
 Forgetting Sarah Marshall, a 2008 film